MVV or MVV Maastricht is a Dutch football club.

MVV may also refer to:

Maedi-visna virus, variant of the retrovirus visna virus
Mannheimer Versorgungs- und Verkehrsgesellschaft (MVV GmbH), German city works of Mannheim
Megève Aerodrome (IATA code MVV), airport in south-eastern France
Münchner Verkehrs- und Tarifverbund, transit authority of the city of Munich
MVV Energie, German utility company headquartered in Mannheim